A front man is the lead vocalist for a band.

Front man may also refer to:
Nyko FrontMan, a guitar controller for game systems
"Front Man", an episode of Squid Game
 "Front Man", an episode of White Collar

See also
Agent (law), a person authorized to act on behalf of another to create legal relations with a third party
Foreign agent, anyone who actively carries out the interests of a foreign country while located in another host country
Straw man (law), a legal owner of a property who has no beneficial interest in the property